The 44M Zrínyi I was a Hungarian assault gun of the Second World War. Developed on the basis of the 43M Zrínyi, it was armed with a longer 75 mm gun, more suited to anti-tank warfare. 

The 43M itself was developed on the chassis of the much less successful 40M Turán medium tank.

References 

World War II assault guns
World War II military equipment of Hungary
Armoured fighting vehicles of Hungary